Dr. Anand  is a 1966 Indian Telugu-language drama film, produced by D. Venkatapathi Reddy under the Ravindra Art Productions banner and directed by V. Madhusudhana Rao. It stars N. T. Rama Rao, Anjali Devi and Kanchana with music composed by K. V. Mahadevan.

Plot
Dr. Anand (N. T. Rama Rao) is a well-renowned person in society, he leads a happy family life with his wife Madhavi (Anjali Devi) and two kids. Unfortunately, Madhavi suffers from cancer, but Anand does not lose heart, tries to protect her health and engages himself with hospital and patients. Madhavi feels bad for it and asks him to remarry, but he never agrees. Once Anand visits a program of a popular dancer, Vijaya (Kanchana), during the performance she fractures her leg and Anand brings her to the hospital. Vijaya is emotionally imbalanced and suffers from panic attacks. Anand gives her moral support and boosts her willpower. She requests Anand to stay with her, he does so and gets attracted to her. The hospital staff and other people suspect their relation and rumors spread. So, Anand sends Vijaya away, but gets mentally disturbed and leaves for her. On the way, he gives a lift to a heart patient (again N. T. Rama Rao) who resembles him. The person dies on the way, so, Anand exchanges his clothes with him and leaves where everyone thinks that Dr. Anand died. After that, Anand reaches Vijaya, they live happily for some time, thereafter, Anand's cheating breaks out and Vijaya asks him to get away. Depressed, Anand meets with an accident in which his face is totally spoiled. After recovery, Anand learns that his hospital was expanded and his statue is also installed. He reaches the function, but no one recognizes him and visits his house where he sees Madhavi's health is getting worse day by day. Anand introduces himself as his friend, starts treating Madhavi and takes care of the children. Meanwhile, everyone suspects him as the murderer of Dr. Anand, he is arrested and convicted in the court. At last, Vijaya arrives and proves that him as Anand. Finally, she reunites Anand with his family and dedicates her life by constructing an orphanage in the name of Dr. Anand.

Cast
N. T. Rama Rao as Dr. Anand
Anjali Devi as Madhavi
Kanchana as Vijaya
V. Nagayya as Justice Dharma Rao
Ramana Reddy  as Dr. Mrutyunjaya Rao
Padmanabham as Chalapathi Rao
Raja Babu as Nookalu
Chadalavada as Kotayya
Rama Prabha as Mathi
 Baby Padmini as Baby
Master Adinarayana Rao as Babu

Soundtrack

Music composed by K. V. Mahadevan. Music released by Audio Company.

References

External links

Indian drama films
Films directed by V. Madhusudhana Rao
Films scored by K. V. Mahadevan